Huddersfield Town's 1940–41 campaign saw Town play their first full season in the Wartime League. They finished 11th in the North Regional League, based on a goal average system.

Results

North Regional League

League War Cup

Notes

Huddersfield Town A.F.C. seasons
Huddersfield Town